The Ronoake Baptist Church is a historic church in rural Clark County, Arkansas.  The church is located at the end of Ronoake Church Road, off United States Route 67 north of Gurdon.  The single-story wood-frame church was built in 1945 to serve an African-American congregation founded in 1893, and is an excellent example of Craftsman architecture.  It has a low-pitch gable roof with broad eaves, with exposed rafter tails, kingpost supports, and banks of windows characteristic of the style.  The church's fellowship hall dates to roughly the same period, and has similar styling.

The church was listed on the National Register of Historic Places in 2011.

See also
National Register of Historic Places listings in Clark County, Arkansas

References

Churches on the National Register of Historic Places in Arkansas
Buildings and structures in Clark County, Arkansas
Baptist churches in Arkansas
Churches completed in 1945
National Register of Historic Places in Clark County, Arkansas